Oedaspis farinosa is a species of tephritid or fruit flies in the genus Oedaspis of the family Tephritidae.

Distribution
Algeria.

References

Tephritinae
Insects described in 1927
Diptera of Europe